Coniatus is a genus of true weevils in the subfamily Hyperinae. Species have a palaearctic distribution in Eurasia, Africa and America. There are also fossil species known from the Cenozoic.

References 

 Capiomont, G. 1867: Révision de la Tribu des Hypérides, Lacordaire, et en particulier des genres Hypera Germ., Limobius, Schönh. et Coniatus (Germ.) Schönh. renfermant la description de plusieurs genres nouveaux et de 85 espèces nouvelles. Annales de la Société Entomologique de France, (4)7(3): 417–456 + pl. 11–12.

External links 

 
 
 Coniatus at insectoid.info

Curculionidae genera
Hyperinae